Lucas Farias Gomes (born 18 August 1994) is a Brazilian professional footballer who plays as a right back, most recently for USL Championship club Indy Eleven.

Honours
Brazil U-20
 Toulon Tournament: 2013

References

External links
 
 

1994 births
Living people
Brazilian footballers
Campeonato Brasileiro Série A players
Campeonato Brasileiro Série B players
São Paulo FC players
Boa Esporte Clube players
Clube Náutico Capibaribe players
G.D. Estoril Praia players
Esporte Clube São Bento players
Brazilian expatriate footballers
Brazilian expatriate sportspeople in Portugal
Expatriate footballers in Portugal
Association football fullbacks
Indy Eleven players
USL Championship players
Brazilian expatriate sportspeople in the United States
Expatriate soccer players in the United States
Footballers from São Paulo